Microrhopala rubrolineata is a species of leaf beetle in the family Chrysomelidae. It is found in Central America and North America.

Subspecies
These four subspecies belong to the species Microrhopala rubrolineata:
 Microrhopala rubrolineata militaris
 Microrhopala rubrolineata rubrolineata J. L. LeConte, 1859
 Microrhopala rubrolineata signaticollis J. L. LeConte, 1859
 Microrhopala rubrolineata vulnerata Horn, 1883

References

Further reading

 
 

Cassidinae
Articles created by Qbugbot
Beetles described in 1843